Marlo Hoogstraten, also known by his stage name MaRLo, is a Dutch-born Australian trance DJ. In 2010, he was voted Australia's Number 2 Trance DJ and overall Number 11 in the Inthemix Top 50 DJ poll. He started his career using hardware synthesizers (Roland JP-8000, Nord Lead, Korg Wavestation, Novation Supernova) and nowadays produces almost exclusively on his computer.

Biography
Hoogstraten is known as MaRLo in the music industry (with the mid-name capitalisation due to his repeated introduction as 'Mario' by radio DJs). Born in Amsterdam the Netherlands, he currently resides in Australia. He has his own label, Reaching Altitude, with signed artists including Heatbeat and Mark Sixma. MaRLo is married to Jano, a trance singer who has collaborated with Armin van Buuren and Andrew Rayel.

Discography

Extended plays

Singles and remixes 
2022
 MaRLo and Sunset Bros. featuring Sydnee Carter - War Eyes (Reaching Altitude, Armada Music)

2021
MaRLo - Hoogenbanger (Self-released)
MaRLo and Frontliner - Hook (Sinphony)
MaRLo - Venom (Reaching Altitude, Armada Music)
Haliene - Walk Through Walls (MaRLo Remix) (Black Hole Recordings) 
Quench - Dreams (MaRLo Remix) (Vicious Black)

2020
MaRLo and Haliene - Say Hello (Reaching Altitude, Armada Music)
MaRLo, Triode and Haliene - Castles in the Sky (Central Station Records)
Will Sparks and MaRLo - Feel It (Rave Culture)
MaRLo and Jantine - For You (Reaching Altitude, Armada Music)
Armin van Buuren and MaRLo featuring Mila Josef - This I Vow (Armada Music)

2019
MaRLo - The Power Within (Altitude 2019 Anthem) (Reaching Altitude, Armada Music)
Pete Delete - Wild Child (MaRLo Edit) (Reaching Altitude, Armada Music)
MaRLo and Matrick - Blast Off (Reaching Altitude, Armada Music)
MaRLo and Feenixpawl - Lighter Than Air (Armind)
MaRLo and Haliene - Whisper (Reaching Altitude, Armada Music)

2018
What So Not featuring Winona Oak - Beautiful (MaRLo Remix) (Counter Records)
MaRLo featuring Emma Chatt - Here We Are (Armind)
MaRLo with Avao - We Are The Future (Reaching Altitude, Armada Music)
Sunset Bros and Mark McCabe - I'm Feeling It (In The Air) (MaRLo Remix) (Universal Music Operations)
MaRLo with Roxanne Emery - A Thousand Seas (Reaching Altitude, Armada Music)
Jean Clemence - Roots (MaRLo Edit) (Reaching Altitude, Armada Music)
MaRLo - Enough Echo (Reaching Altitude, Armada Music)

2017
MaRLo - The Launch (Reaching Altitude, Armada Music)
MaRLo - Onaj (A State of Trance, Armada Music)
Bobby Neon and Nick Arbor featuring Lokka Vox - What You Said (MaRLo Remix) (Genesis Recordings)
MaRLo with First State - Falling Down (Armind, Armada Music)\
Armin van Buuren - I Live For That Energy (MaRLo Remix) (Armada Music)

2016
MaRLo featuring Emma Chatt – Leave My Hand (Armind, Armada Music)
MaRLo – Join Us Now (Who's Afraid of 138?!, Armada Music)
MaRLo and Chloe – You And Me (Armind, Armada Music)
Orjan Nilsen – Between The Rays (MaRLo Remix)
Ferry Corsten – Beautiful (MaRLo Remix)
MaRLo – Titans (A State Of Trance, Armada Music)
MaRLo – Darkside

2015
MaRLo featuring Jano – The Dreamers (A State of Trance, Armada Music)
MaRLo – Atlantis (A State of Trance,  Armada Music)
MaRLo – Ignite (A State of Trance, Armada Music)
Marcel Woods – Advanced (MaRLo Remix) [High Contrast Recordings]
MaRLo featuring Christina Novelli – Hold It Together (Armind, Armada Music)
Dash Berlin - Shelter (feat. Roxanne Emery) [MaRLo Remix] (Armada Music)
MaRLo – Strength (Armind, Armada Music)

2014

MaRLo vs Fisherman & Hawkins – Forces (A State of Trance, Armada Music)
MaRLo featuring Jano – Haunted (A State of Trance, Armada Music)
MaRLo – Barracuda (A State of Trance, Armada Music)
MaRLo – Poseidon (A State of Trance, Armada Music)

2013
MaRLo – The Future (Armada Captivating, Armada Music)
MaRLo – Visions (A State of Trance, Armada Music)
MaRLo – Boom (A State of Trance, Armada Music)

2012

Rex Mundi – Opera of Northern Ocean (MaRLo Remix) [Armada Music]
Paul Webster featuring Angelic Amanda – Time (MaRLo Remix, Armada Music]
Solarstone – Pure (MaRLo Remix) [Black Hole Recordings]
MaRLo – Showgrounds (A State of Trance, Armada Music)
MaRLo – Silverback (A State of Trance, Armada Music)
MaRLo – Underneath (A State of Trance, Armada Music)
MaRLo – Megalodon (A State of Trance, Armada Music)
MaRLo – Evolution (A State of Trance, Armada Music)
MaRLo – Freedive (A State of Trance, Armada Music)
Angger Dimas and Polina – Release Me (MaRLo Remix) [Vicious]

2011

Gaia – Stellar (MaRLo Remix) [Armind (Armada)]
MaRLo featuring Jano – Just Breathe [Spinnin Records]
MaRLo featuring Jano – The Island [Spinnin Records]
MaRLo – Forward Thinking/Semtex [RESET/Spinnin Records]
Ferry Corsten – Punk (MaRLo Remix) [FLASHOVER]
Sied van Riel – MME (MaRLo Remix) [Spinnin Records]
W&W – Impact (MaRLo Remix) [Armada Music]

2010

MaRLo – Magnetic [Spinnin Records]
MaRLo – Superlift [Spinnin Records]
MaRLo – Not Alone [Spinnin Records]
MaRLo – Capture [NOYS Music]
Alex Kunnari and Heikki L – Brand New Day (MaRLo Remix) [Black Hole Recordings]
Rory Gallagher – Dark Side of the Sun (MaRLo Remix) [Armada Music]
Jude Eliott – Twilight (MaRLo Remix) [Central Station Records]

2009

MaRLo – Ula [Armada]
MaRLo featuring Kristen Marlo – Is It Real [NOYS Music]
MaRLo – Alpha [Pangea]
Ohmna featuring Nurlaila – Key of Life (MaRLo Remix) [Armada Music]
Ferry Corsten – Brainbox (MaRLo Remix) [Flashover Recordings]
Rozza – Ones We Love (MaRLo remix) [Neuroscience]
Arcane Science featuring Rhys Oris – Should Have Told Me (MaRLo Remix) [NOYS Music]

Live performances
Ministry of Sound Trance Nation CD, 14 date tour around Australia 2010
Trance Energy – The Netherlands
Trance Energy Australia
 ASOT 550 – The Netherlands
Uitmarkt Festival – The Netherlands
GO-Parc – Germany
Paradiso – Indonesia
Home Club – Singapore
World DJ Festival 2013 – Seoul, Korea
Sky Garden – Indonesia
Cirque du Soleil – Belgium
Sensation
Creamfields
Godskitchen
Slinky
Gatecrasher
Stereosonic
Cream
Transmission
A State of Trance 700 2015 - Sydney, Australia and Utrecht, The Netherlands, Miami Ultra Music Festival
A State of Trance 750 2016 - Utrecht, The Netherlands, Miami Ultra Music Festival
Atlantis 2015, Melbourne and Sydney, Australia
Atlantis 2016, Melbourne and Sydney, Australia
Djakarta Warehouse Project 10th Edition (DWPX) 2018, Bali, Indonesia
Altitude 2019, Melbourne, Sydney, Brisbane and Perth, Australia

References

Interview With MaRLo with Clubbing9ine.com. TWELVE 13 Music Festival exclusive interview. Retrieved 2013-03-12.

External links
 
 
 

Dutch trance musicians
Remixers
Armada Music artists
Club DJs
Living people
Dutch DJs
Musicians from Amsterdam
Dutch emigrants to Australia
Electronic dance music DJs
1993 births